Flèche was an  of the French Navy. She served in the Crimean War before being used for hydrographic surveys and eventually as a coal hulk at Brest.

Career 
Flèche took part in the Battle of Kinburn in 1855. She served in the Adriatic Sea from 1859, and in Mexico from 1863.

She conducted hydrographic surveys off Brest from 1864. In 1877, she was hulked and used as a coal depot in Brest until 1862, when she was broken up.

Citations and references

Citations

References
 

Ships built in France
1855 ships